KTTU may refer to:

 KTTU (TV), a television station (channel 18) licensed to Tucson, Arizona, United States
 KTTU-FM, a radio station (97.3 FM) licensed to New Deal, Texas, United States
 KATN, a television station (channel 2) licensed to Fairbanks, Alaska, United States, which used the call sign KTTU-TV from 1981 to 1984